Matthew Prince (born July 13, 1973) is an American former professional wrestler, better known by his ring name Wifebeater. He is best known for his tenure in Combat Zone Wrestling from 1999 to 2004. He is known for his ring attire (a wifebeater and jeans) and a weed whacker that he brought to the ring with him, and sometimes used on his opponents.

Professional wrestling career
Wifebeater debuted in Combat Zone Wrestling in August 1999, on the show that was called "Pyramid of Hell" in a match against Trent Acid. In September 1999 Wifebeater defeated Nick Gage to win his first World Heavyweight Championship. Wifebeater held the title until December 1999, when he lost it to John Zandig. Wifebeater went on to win the World Heavyweight Title two more times and the Iron Man Championship four times. He would also team up with Justice Pain to form the H8 Club and win the World Tag Team Championship. Wifebeater and Justice Pain lost the titles to Nick Gage and Nate Hatred, who later also referred to themselves as the hate club. After this, Wifebeater and Justice Pain broke up and began feuding. This feud ended at Cage of Death III inside the Cage of Death for the world title where Pain defeated Wifebeater. During one period in 2001 he was a member of the stable "Big Dealz" along with John Zandig, Nick Mondo, Jun Kasai, Z-Barr and Trent Acid.

In 2002, Wifebeater won the first-ever CZW Tournament of Death after defeating Nick Mondo in the finals. He wrestled his retirement match in November 2002, but made a return a year later in the same month to join Zandig's team for Cage of Death V. In 2004, he won the third Tournament of Death after defeating Necro Butcher in the finals. Later in the year, Justice Pain returned and rejoined Wifebeater to reform the H8 Club. They targeted the H8 Club of Gage and Hatred and wrestled in what would be his final "official" CZW match in December 2004 at Cage Of Death 6. That night, Justice Pain turned on Wifebeater. Since then, Prince has made some appearances back in the Combat Zone. One was a run in on the ROH wrestlers during a big brawl between CZW and ROH at ROH's "Arena Warfare" in early 2006. His next appearance was at CZW's event Trapped in August 2006, filling in for a vacant J.C. Bailey. In this contest, Wifebeater went up against Danny Havoc in a match with the Cage of Death surrounding the ring.

Championships and accomplishments
Big Japan Pro Wrestling
BJW Tag Team Championship (1 time) – with Justice Pain
Combat Zone Wrestling
CZW Death Match Championship (1 time)
CZW Iron Man Championship (4 times)
CZW World Heavyweight Championship (3 times)
CZW World Tag Team Championship (1 time) – with Justice Pain
Tournament of Death (I, III)
Match of the Year (2002) vs. Nick Mondo
CZW Hall of Fame (2009)

References

External links
Other Superstars - Wifebeater
Wifebeater at Online World of Wrestling

Living people
Sportspeople from Dallas
American male professional wrestlers
Professional wrestlers from Texas
United States Marines
1973 births
CZW World Heavyweight Champions
20th-century professional wrestlers
21st-century professional wrestlers
BJW Tag Team Champions
CZW Iron Man Champions